This is a list of supermarket chains in South America.

Argentina
 La Anónima
 Carrefour
 Coto
 Dia %
 Disco-Jumbo-Vea (Cencosud)
 La Genovesa
 Comodín
 Supermercado Dar
 Buenos Días
 Vital
 Maxiconsumo
 Diarco
 Libertad
 Emilio Luque
 Kilbel
 Alvear
 Becerra
 Supermercados La Proveeduría
 Changomás (owned by Walmart Argentina)
 Supermercados Llaneza
 Walmart
 Makro

Bolivia
 EMAPA (State-owned)
 Hipermaxi
 Fidalga
 IC Norte
 Multicenter
 Ketal
 Tía

Brazil

Chile
 Jumbo (owned by Cencosud)
 Santa Isabel (owned by Cencosud)
 Líder (owned by Walmart-Chile)
 Superbodega Acuenta (owned by Walmart-Chile)
 Tottus (owned by Falabella)
 Unimarc (owned by SMU S.A.)

Colombia
 Alkosto (cash & carry)
 Almacenes la 14 
 Almacenes Éxito owned by Groupe Casino
 Almacenes Ley (brand of Almacenes Exito)
 Bodegas Surtimax (cash & carry, brand of Almacenes Exito)
 Cafam (rebranded to Almacenes Exito in 2010)
 Carulla (brand of Almacenes Exito)
 Pomona (brand of Almacenes Exito)
 SuperLEY (rebranded to Almacenes Ley in 2003)
 Vivero (rebranded to Almacenes Exito in 2007)
 Almacenes Olímpica
 SAO (hypermarkets to Olimpica)
 Ara (from 2013, brand to Jeronimo Martins)
 Jumbo
 Metro
 Carrefour
 Colsubsidio
 Cooratiendas
 Consumo
 D1 (first discounter supermarket in Colombia)
 Euro supermercado
 Makro (cash & carry)
 Super Inter
 Surtifruver de la Sabana (fruits and vegetables)
 Tía
 Yep (gone into liquidation)

Ecuador

 Mi Comisariato / HYPER market
 Supermaxi / Megamaxi
 Tía

Paraguay
 Stock owned by Grupo Vierci
 Super Seis owned by Grupo Vierci
 Diefer
 La Bomba
 Salemma 
 Gran Via
 Real

Peru
 Grupo Falabella
 Tottus
 Precio Uno
 Tottus Vecino
 SHV Holdings N.V.
 Makro
 Supermercados Peruanos
 Mass
 Economax
 Market San Jorge
 Plaza Vea
 Vivanda
 Cencosud
 Metro
 Wong

Uruguay
 
 Disco owned by Groupe Casino
  owned by Groupe Casino
 Tienda Inglesa
 El Dorado

Venezuela
 Abasto Bicentenario
 Automercados Plaza's
 Central Madeirense
 Líder
 Makro
 Mikro
 Mercal
 San Diego
 Supermercado La Franco Italiana
 Unicasa
 Excelsior Gama

References

South America
 
South America-related lists